The 21st Chess Olympiad, organized by FIDE and comprising an open team tournament, as well as several other events designed to promote the game of chess, took place between June 6 and June 30, 1974, in Nice, France.

Bobby Fischer was still the reigning World Champion, but had not played a single game of tournament chess since he won the title in 1972 and was not present in Nice either. However, the American team still managed to secure third place in his absence.

For the same reason, for the second time in a row, the Soviet team was not led by the current world champion. It did, however, feature three previous (Tal, Petrosian, and Spassky) as well as one future champion (Karpov). The team won by 8½ points, the biggest victory margin yet, and took home their twelfth consecutive gold medals, with Yugoslavia and the United States taking the silver and bronze, respectively.

With a complete lack of tension in the championship race, the tournament had more than its share of political tension. In Final B, the Tunisian team refused to play Israel, so the score was computed according to Elo ratings, and awarded as a 3–1 win for the Israeli team.

Due to their apartheid policies, both South Africa and Rhodesia were expelled from FIDE with three rounds to go. The South African team withdrew from the tournament, and their Final C results were deleted from the overall standings. After FIDE president Max Euwe failed to have Rhodesia ejected from the Olympiad, they were allowed to finish the tournament and won Final E, with help from default victories against Iraq and Algeria who refused to play them in protest.

Results

Preliminaries

A total of 74 teams were divided into eight preliminary groups of nine or ten teams each, from which the top two advanced to Final A, no. 3-4 to Final B, etc. Preliminary head-to-head results were carried over to the finals, so no team met any other team more than once. All preliminary groups and finals were played as round-robin tournaments.

The results were as follows:

 Group 1: 

 Group 2: 

 Group 3: 

 Group 4: 

 Only two players from  the Nicaraguan team arrived in Nice, and after the team were forced to forfeit their first match against Chile, Nicaragua withdrew from the tournament. The forfeit was deleted from the Group 4 standings.

 Group 5: 

 Group 6: 

 Group 7: 

 Group 8:

Finals

{| class="wikitable"
|+ Final A
! # !! Country !! Players !! Averagerating !! Points !! MP
|-
| style="background:gold;"|1 ||  || Karpov, Korchnoi, Spassky, Petrosian, Tal, Kuzmin || 2665 || 46 || 
|-
| style="background:silver;"|2 ||  || Gligorić, Ljubojević, Ivkov, Planinc, Velimirović, Parma || 2566 || 37½ || 
|-
| style="background:#cc9966;"|3 ||  || Kavalek, Byrne, Browne, Reshevsky, Lombardy, Tarjan || 2586 || 36½ || 22
|-
| 4 ||  || Radulov, Padevsky, Tringov, Popov, Spasov, Kirov || 2475 || 36½ || 21
|-
| 5 ||  || Timman, Donner, Sosonko, Ree, Enklaar, Kuijpers || 2478 || 35½ || 
|-
| 6 ||  || Portisch, Bilek, Csom, Ribli, Forintos, Sax || 2554 || 35 || 
|-
| 7 ||  || Schmid, Unzicker, Pfleger, Hecht, Dueball, Kestler || 2534 || 32 || 
|-
| 8 ||  || Gheorghiu, Ciocâltea, Ghițescu, Ghizdavu, Partoș, Pavlov || 2468 || 29½ || 16
|-
| 9 ||  || Hort, Jansa, Filip, Přibyl, Plachetka, Lechtýnský || 2521 || 29½ || 14
|-
| 10 ||  || Hartston, Keene, Penrose, Whiteley, Stean, Markland || 2456 || 26 || 
|-
| 11 ||  || Torre, Cardoso, Naranja, Balinas, Lontoc, Bordonada || 2358 || 25½ || 12
|-
| 12 ||  || Pomar, Torán, Calvo, Bellón López, Visier Segovia, Sanz || 2428 || 25½ || 11
|-
| 13 ||  || Andersson, Ornstein, Jansson, Liljedahl, Uddenfeldt, Kinnmark || 2448 || 25 || 
|-
| 14 ||  || Quinteros, Sanguineti, Najdorf, Rubinetti, Szmetan, Debarnot || 2491 || 23½ || 
|-
| 15 ||  || Westerinen, Poutiainen, Rantanen, Hurme, Venäläinen, Raaste || 2319 || 22 || 
|-
| 16 ||  || Williams, Hutchings, Jones, Cooper, Sully, Trevelyan || 2285 || 14½ || 
|}

{| class="wikitable"
|+ Final B
! # !!Country !! Players !! Averagerating !! Points !! MP
|-
| 17 ||  || Liberzon,  Kraidman,  Czerniak,  Kagan,  Bleiman,  Radashkovich || 2465 || 40½ || 
|-
| 18 ||  || Robatsch,  Dückstein,  Prameshuber,  Janetschek,  Röhrl,  Stoppel  || 2388 || 38½ || 
|-
| 19 ||  || Mariotti,  Tatai,  Tóth,  Cosulich,  Zichichi,  Cappello  || 2428 || 38 || 
|-
| 20 ||  || Castro,  Cuartas,  Alzate,  García,  de Greiff,  Silva  || 2354 || 32½ || 
|-
| 21 ||  || Øgaard,  Johannessen,  Zwaig,  Hoen,  Ulrichsen,  Moen  || 2410 || 32 || 19
|-
| 22 ||  || Ólafsson,  Sigurjónsson,  Jóhannsson,  Kristinsson,  Ásmundsson,  Víglundsson  || 2456 || 32 || 18
|-
| 23 ||  || Schmidt,  Doda,  Pytel,  Kostro,  Adamski,  Pokojowczyk  || 2430 || 32 || 17
|-
| 24 ||  || Suttles,  Biyiasas,  Yanofsky,  Kuprejanov,  Day,  Piasetski  || 2419 || 31 || 18
|-
| 25 ||  || García González,  García Martínez,  Rodríguez Cordoba,  Jiménez,  Estévez Morales,  Rodríguez Céspedes  || 2423 || 31 || 15
|-
| 26 ||  || Andersen,  Rath,  Moe,  Iskov,  Kølbæk,  Jacobsen  || 2405 || 31 || 14
|-
| 27 ||  || Hug,  Lombard,  Schaufelberger,  Wirthensohn,  Gereben,  Ott  || 2380 || 29 || 
|-
| 28 ||  || Maclès,  Todorcevic,  Seret,  Puhm,  Bessenay,  Benoit  || 2381 || 27½ || 
|-
| 29 ||  || Pritchett,  McKay,  Levy,  Jamieson,  Bonner,  Young  || 2319 || 25½ || 
|-
| 30 ||  || Boey,  Van Seters,  Beyen,  Bonne,  De Bruycker,  Wostyn  || 2323 || 23½ || 
|-
| 31 ||  || Durão,  Silva,  Cordovil,  Ribeiro,  Santos L.,  Santos J. P.  || 2306 || 19½ || 
|-
| 32 ||  || Bouaziz,  Belkadi,  Tabbane,  Teboudi K.,  Najar C.,  Graa  || 2200 || 17½ || 
|}

{| class="wikitable"
|+ Final C
! # !!Country !! Players !! Averagerating !! Points !! MP
|-
| 33 ||  || Jamieson, Fuller, Shaw, Woodhams, Pope, Purdy || 2286 || 39 || 
|-
| 34 ||  || Harandi, Sharif, Shirazi, Sawadkuhi, Shahsavar, Safarzadeh || 2320 || 34½ || 
|-
| 35 ||  || Mecking, Câmara, van Riemsdijk, Segal, Nóbrega, Toth || 2424 || 32½ || 
|-
| 36 ||  || Lhagva, Ujtumen, Myagmarsuren, Gungabazar, Tumurbator, Purevzhav || 2364 || 31½ || 
|-
| 37 ||  || MacGrillen, Littleton, Cox, Henry, Heidenfeld, Cassidy || 2245 || 30½ || 
|-
| 38 ||  || Sánchez, Velasco, Bugueño, Letelier, Grunberg, Ojeda || 2384 || 30 || 17
|-
| 39 ||  || Ardiansyah, Sampouw, Suwuh, Bessaria, Sinulingga, Damanik || 2249 || 30 || 14
|-
| 40 ||  || Makropoulos, Skalkotas, Trikaliotis, Vizantiadis, Tsouros, Gavrilakis || 2263 || 27½ || 16
|-
| 41 ||  || Campos López, Frey, Escondrillas, Ramírez, Lara, Ocampo || 2283 || 27½ || 14
|-
| 42 ||  || Onat, Pekün, Bilyap, Olgaç, Erözbek, Süer || 2265 || 27 || 
|-
| 43 ||  || Pang Kwok Leong, Leow, Lee Chee Seng, Choong Liong On, Lim Kok Ann, Chia || 2219 || 25 || 
|-
| 44 ||  || Cherem, Gamboa, Sánchez, Caro, Mijares, Guerra || 2203 || 24½ || 
|-
| 45 ||  || Fairhurst, Sarapu, Garbett, Green, Stuart, Kerr || 2230 || 22½ || 
|-
| 46 ||  || Yépez, Idrovo, Camatón, Verduga, Galarza, Dillon || 2213 || 22 || 
|-
| 47 ||  || Rifai S., Kassabe, Tabba, Arik A., Albaba M., Kabbani M. || 2200 || 16 || 
|- bgcolor="salmon"
| WD ||  South Africa || Friedgood, Kroon, Korostenski, de Villiers, Bloch, Aalbersberg || 2228 || - || 
|}

{| class="wikitable"
|+ Final D
! # !!Country !! Players !! Averagerating !! Points !! MP
|-
| 48 ||  || Butt, Farooqui, Ahmad N., Ahmad I., Mir, Ali || 2200 || 49½ || 
|-
| 49 ||  || Torres, Moraza Choisme, Colón Romero A., Freyre, Bird Picó, Falcón  || 2203 || 44½ || 
|-
| 50 ||  || Delgado, Gonzáles, Juliao, Pérez, Pérez Nivar, Yabra  || 2200 || 43½ || 
|-
| 51 ||  || Feller, Milbers, Peters, Schammo, Schneider, Philippe  || 2201 || 38½ || 
|-
| 52 ||  || Tarazi, Daoud, Thomas, Loheac-Ammoun, Sursock, Bedrossian  || 2206 || 35 || 20
|-
| 53 ||  || Lamas Baliero, Bademian Orchanian, Ricetto, Pastori, Maiztegui Casas, Israel Catán  || 2200 || 35 || 17
|-
| 54 ||  || Ramón Martínez, Fabrega, Cuéllar, Moreno Merediz, Lombana, Denis  || 2200 || 33 || 
|-
| 55 ||  || Tasic, Brodeur, Scharf, Kostjoerin, Martelli R., Angles d'Auriac  || 2200 || 29½ || 
|-
| 56 ||  || Camilleri, Attard, Gouder, Cilia Vincenti, Casha, Soler  || 2206 || 29 || 
|-
| 57 ||  || Kan Wai Shui, Hasan, Ko Chi, Krouk, Sin Kuen, Smith M.  || 2240 || 27½ || 13
|-
| 58 ||  || Apol, Petersen, Midjord, Olsen, Thomsen, Ziska  || 2200 || 27½ || 12
|-
| 59 ||  || Chan Mun Fye, Foo Lum Choon, Choo Min Wang, Wahid, Jamaluddin, Ng  || 2200 || 24½ || 
|-
| 60 ||  || Bakali, Nejjar, Sbia, Iraqui, Meftouh, Dakka  || 2200 || 21½ || 
|-
| 61 ||  || Al-Mallah, Arafat, Hamam, Sanoseyan, Baslan M., Haddad  || 2200 || 17½ || 
|-
| 62 ||  || Palmer, Withers, Moriarty, Gavey, Savident, Knight  || 2200 || 12 || 2
|-
| 63 ||  || Abraham, Purington, Reussner, Scherman A., Scherman N., Fyfe-Reussner, Bushnaq  || 2200 || 12 || 2
|}

{| class="wikitable"
|+ Final E
! # !!Country !! Players !! Averagerating !! Points
|-
| 64 ||  || Donnely, Fox, Barlow, Levy, Hillmann, Hope M. || 2200 || 28½
|-
| 65 ||  || Al-Shakarchi, Mubarak, Al-Kazzaz R. K., Taha, Muhsin F., Subbar  || 2200 || 24½
|-
| 66 ||  || Weiland, Zalm, Van Loon, Fernán, Croes, Rigaud O. W.  || 2200 || 21½
|-
| 67 ||  || Gonda, Naito, Hamada, Arita, Tatsutomi, Seki  || 2200 || 20½
|-
| 68 ||  || Riza, Scoatarin, Vassiades, Hadjittofis, Kleopas, Hadjiyiannis  || 2200 || 19
|-
| 69 ||  || Mohipp A., Brassington F., Ramon-Fortune, Sears, Lee, Poon A. C.  || 2200 || 18
|-
| 70 ||  || Chaabi, Bouzida M., Baghli, Hanni F.  || 2200 || 17
|-
| 71 ||  || Gómez Abad, Sanz, De la Casa, Iglesias, Pantebre Martínez, Fité Barris  || 2200 || 13
|-
| 72 ||  || Antonas, Thompson, Rolle, Adderley, Ramcharran, Ingraham  || 2200 || 11
|-
| 73 ||  || Hook, Van Dyke B., Green S. L., Pickering, Downing, Van Dyke  || 2200 || 8½
|}

Final «A» 
 Matches played in semi-finals are italicized.
{| class="wikitable"
|-
! Place
! Country
! 1 !!2 !!3 !!4 !!5 !!6 !!7 !!8 !!9 !!10 !!11 !!12 !!13 !!14 !!15 !!16
! !!+ !!- !!= !!Points
|- 
! 1
| align=left bgcolor="gold"|
| -  || style="color: red;" |2½ ||style="color: red;"|3 ||style="color: green;"|2 ||style="color: red;"|3 ||style="color: green;"|2 ||style="color: red;"|3½ ||style="color: red;"|3½ ||style="color: red;"|3 ||style="color: red;"|3 ||style="color: red;"|3½ ||style="color: red;"|4 ||style="color: red;"|2½ ||style="color: red;"|2½ ||style="color: red;"|4 ||style="color: red;"|4
! 
|13 ||0 ||2 ||align=center|46
|-
! 2
| align=left bgcolor="silver"| 
|style="color: blue"|1½ || -  || style="color: blue" |1½ ||style="color: green"|2 ||style="color: red"|2½ ||style="color: blue"|1 ||style="color: red"|2½ ||style="color: green"|2 ||style="color: red"|3½ ||style="color: green"|2 ||style="color: red"|3 ||style="color: red"|3½ ||style="color: red"|3 ||style="color: red"|3½ ||style="color: green"|2 ||style="color: red;"|4
! 
|8 ||3 ||4 ||align=center|37½
|-
! 3
| align=left bgcolor="CC9966"| 
|style="color: blue"|1 ||style="color: red"|2½ || -  || style="color: blue" |1½ ||style="color: red"|2½ ||style="color: green"|2 ||style="color: blue"|1½ ||style="color: red"|3 ||style="color: red"|2½ ||style="color: red"|3 ||style="color: green"|2 ||style="color: red"|3 ||style="color: red"|3½ ||style="color: red"|2½ ||style="color: red"|3½ ||style="color: red;"|2½
! 
|10 ||3 ||2 ||align=center|36½
|-
! 4
| align=left|
|style="color: green;"|2 ||style="color: green"|2 ||style="color: red;"|2½ || -  || style="color: green;" |2 ||style="color: blue"|1½ ||style="color: green;"|2 ||style="color: green;"|2 ||style="color: green"|2 ||style="color: red;"|3 ||style="color: red;"|3 ||style="color: red"|3 ||style="color: red;"|3 ||style="color: green;"|2 ||style="color: red"|2½ ||style="color: red;"|4
! 
|7 ||1 ||7 ||align=center|36½
|-
! 5
| align=left|
|style="color: blue;"|1 ||style="color: blue;"|1½ ||style="color: blue;"|1½ ||style="color: green;"|2 || -  || style="color: green;" |2 ||style="color: green;"|2 ||style="color: green;"|2 ||style="color: red;"|2½ ||style="color: red;"|2½ ||style="color: red;"|3½ ||style="color: red;"|2½ ||style="color: red;"|2½ ||style="color: red;"|3 ||style="color: red;"|3 ||style="color: red;"|4
! 
|8 ||3 ||4 ||align=center|35½
|-
! 6
| align=left|
|style="color: green;"|2 ||style="color: red;"|3 ||style="color: green;"|2 ||style="color: red"|2½ ||style="color: green;"|2 || -  || style="color: red" |2½ ||style="color: blue;"|1 ||style="color: blue;"|1½ ||style="color: red;"|2½ ||style="color: blue;"|1 ||style="color: red;"|2½  ||style="color: red;"|2½ ||style="color: red;"|3½ ||style="color: red;"|3 ||style="color: red;"|3½
! 
|9 ||3 ||3 ||align=center|35
|-
! 7
| align=left|
|style="color: blue"|½ ||style="color: blue;"|1½ ||style="color: red;"|2½ ||style="color: green;"|2 ||style="color: green;"|2 ||style="color: blue"|1½ || -  || style="color: green;" |2  ||style="color: green;"|2 ||style="color: red;"|2½ ||style="color: red;"|2½ ||style="color: red;"|2½ ||style="color: green;"|2 ||style="color: red;"|2½ ||style="color: red;"|3 ||style="color: red;"|3
! 
|7 ||3 ||5 ||align=center|32
|-
! 8
| align=left|
|style="color: blue;"|½ ||style="color: green;"|2 ||style="color: blue;"|1 ||style="color: green;"|2 ||style="color: green;"|2 ||style="color: red;"|3 ||style="color: green;"|2 || -  || style="color: green" |2 ||style="color: green;"|2 ||style="color: green;"|2 ||style="color: green;"|2 ||style="color: red"|3 ||style="color: blue;"|1 ||style="color: red;"|2½ ||style="color: red;"|2½
! 
|4 ||3 ||8 ||align=center|29½
|-
! 9
| align=left|
|style="color: blue;"|1 ||style="color: blue;"|½ ||style="color: blue;"|1½ ||style="color: green"|2 ||style="color: blue;"|1½ ||style="color: red;"|2½ ||style="color: green;"|2 ||style="color: green"|2 || -  || style="color: red;" |3 ||style="color: blue;"|1 ||style="color: blue;"|1½ ||style="color: green;"|2 ||style="color: red;"|3 ||style="color: red"|3½ ||style="color: red;"|2½
! 
|5 ||6 ||4 ||align=center|29½
|-
! 10
| align=left|
|style="color: blue;"|1 ||style="color: green"|2 ||style="color: blue"|1 ||style="color: blue;"|1 ||style="color: blue;"|1½ ||style="color: blue;"|1½ ||style="color: blue;"|1½ ||style="color: green;"|2 ||style="color: blue;"|1 || -  || style="color: green;" |2 ||style="color: green;"|2 ||style="color: green"|2 ||style="color: green;"|2 ||style="color: green;"|2 ||style="color: red;"|3½
! 
|1 ||7 ||7 ||align=center|26
|-
! 11
| align=left|
|style="color: blue;"|½ ||style="color: blue;"|1 ||style="color: green;"|2 ||style="color: blue;"|1 ||style="color: blue;"|½ ||style="color: red;"|3 ||style="color: blue;"|1½ ||style="color: green;"|2 ||style="color: red;"|3 ||style="color: green;"|2 || -  || style="color: blue;" |1 ||style="color: blue;"|1 ||style="color: green;"|2 ||style="color: red;"|2½ ||style="color: red;"|2½
! 
|4 ||7 ||4 ||align=center|25½
|-
! 12
| align=left|
|style="color: blue;"|0 ||style="color: blue;"|½ ||style="color: blue;"|1 ||style="color: blue"|1 ||style="color: blue;"|1½ ||style="color: blue;"|1½ ||style="color: blue;"|1½ ||style="color: green;"|2 ||style="color: red;"|2½ ||style="color: green;"|2 ||style="color: red;"|3 || -  || style="color: green;" |2 ||style="color: red"|2½ ||style="color: blue;"|1½ ||style="color: red;"|3
! 
|4 ||8 ||3 ||align=center|25½
|-
! 13
| align=left|
|style="color: blue;"|1½ ||style="color: blue;"|1 ||style="color: blue;"|½ ||style="color: blue;"|1 ||style="color: blue;"|1½ ||style="color: blue;"|1½ ||style="color: green;"|2 ||style="color: blue"|1 ||style="color: green;"|2 ||style="color: green"|2 ||style="color: red;"|3 ||style="color: green;"|2 || -  || style="color: green;" |2 ||style="color: blue;"|1½ ||style="color: red;"|2½
! 
|2 ||8 ||5 ||align=center|25
|-
! 14
| align=left|
|style="color: blue;"|1½ ||style="color: blue;"|½ ||style="color: blue"|1½ ||style="color: green;"|2 ||style="color: blue;"|1 ||style="color: blue;"|½ ||style="color: blue;"|1½ ||style="color: red;"|3 ||style="color: blue;"|1 ||style="color: green;"|2 ||style="color: green;"|2 ||style="color: blue"|1½ ||style="color: green;"|2 || -  || style="color: green;" |2 ||style="color: blue;"|1½
! 
|1 ||9 ||5 ||align=center|23½
|-
! 15
| align=left|
|style="color: blue;"|0 ||style="color: green"|2 ||style="color: blue;"|½ ||style="color: blue"|1½ ||style="color: blue;"|1 ||style="color: blue;"|1 ||style="color: blue;"|1 ||style="color: blue;"|1½ ||style="color: blue"|½ ||style="color: green;"|2 ||style="color: blue;"|1½ ||style="color: red;"|2½ ||style="color: red;"|2½ ||style="color: green;"|2 || -  ||style="color: red;"|2½
! 
|3 ||9 ||3 ||align=center|22
|-
! 16
| align=left|
|style="color: blue;"|0 ||style="color: blue"|0 ||style="color: blue;"|1½ ||style="color: blue"|0 ||style="color: blue;"|0 ||style="color: blue;"|½ ||style="color: blue;"|1 ||style="color: blue;"|1½ ||style="color: blue"|1½ ||style="color: blue;"|½ ||style="color: blue;"|1½ ||style="color: blue;"|1 ||style="color: blue;"|1½ ||style="color: red;"|2½ ||style="color: blue;"|1½ || -
! 
|1 ||14 ||0 ||align=center|14½
|}

Final «B» 
 Matches played in semi-finals and not played are italicized.
{| class="wikitable"
|-
! Place
! Country
! 17 !!18 !!19 !!20 !!21 !!22 !!23 !!24 !!25 !!26 !!27 !!28 !!29 !!30 !!31 !!32
! !!+ !!- !!= !!Points
|- 
! 17
| align=left|
| -  || style="color: blue;" |1½ ||style="color: red;"|3 ||style="color: red;"|3 ||style="color: blue;"|1 ||style="color: green;"|2 ||style="color: green;"|2 ||style="color: red;"|3½ ||style="color: red;"|2½ ||style="color: red;"|3 ||style="color: red;"|3 ||style="color: red;"|3 ||style="color: red;"|3½ ||style="color: red;"|3½ ||style="color: red;"|3 ||style="color: red;"|3
! 
|11 ||2 ||2 ||align=center|40½
|-
! 18
| align=left| 
|style="color: red"|2½ || -  || style="color: red" |2½ ||style="color: green"|2 ||style="color: red"|2½ ||style="color: green"|2 ||style="color: green"|2 ||style="color: blue"|1½ ||style="color: red"|2½ ||style="color: red"|2½ ||style="color: green"|2 ||style="color: red"|4 ||style="color: green"|2 ||style="color: red"|3½ ||style="color: red"|3½ ||style="color: red;"|3½
! 
|9 ||1 ||5 ||align=center|38½
|-
! 19
| align=left| 
|style="color: blue"|1 ||style="color: blue"|1½ || -  || style="color: red" |3 ||style="color: green"|2 ||style="color: red"|2½ ||style="color: red"|3½ ||style="color: red"|3½ ||style="color: red"|3 ||style="color: blue"|1½ ||style="color: red"|2½ ||style="color: red"|3 ||style="color: red"|4 ||style="color: red"|2½ ||style="color: blue"|1½ ||style="color: red;"|3
! 
|10 ||4 ||1 ||align=center|38
|-
! 20
| align=left|
|style="color: blue;"|1 ||style="color: green"|2 ||style="color: blue;"|1 || -  || style="color: blue;" |1½ ||style="color: green"|2 ||style="color: green;"|2 ||style="color: green;"|2 ||style="color: green"|2 ||style="color: red;"|2½ ||style="color: red;"|3 ||style="color: red"|2½ ||style="color: red;"|3 ||style="color: red;"|2½ ||style="color: red"|2½ ||style="color: red;"|3
! 
|7 ||3 ||5 ||align=center|32½
|-
! 21
| align=left|
|style="color: red;"|3 ||style="color: blue;"|1½ ||style="color: green;"|2 ||style="color: red;"|2½ || -  || style="color: red;" |2½ ||style="color: green;"|2 ||style="color: red;"|2½ ||style="color: red;"|2½ ||style="color: red;"|2½ ||style="color: blue;"|1 ||style="color: blue;"|1½ ||style="color: blue;"|1½ ||style="color: green;"|2 ||style="color: red;"|2½ ||style="color: red;"|2½
! 
|8 ||4 ||3 ||align=center|32
|-
! 22
| align=left|
|style="color: green;"|2 ||style="color: green;"|2 ||style="color: blue;"|1½ ||style="color: green"|2 ||style="color: blue;"|1½ || -  || style="color: red" |2½ ||style="color: green;"|2 ||style="color: green;"|2 ||style="color: green;"|2 ||style="color: red;"|2½ ||style="color: green;"|2 ||style="color: red;"|2½ ||style="color: green;"|2 ||style="color: red;"|3 ||style="color: red;"|2½
! 
|5 ||2 ||8 ||align=center|32
|-
! 23
| align=left|
|style="color: green"|2 ||style="color: green;"|2 ||style="color: blue;"|½ ||style="color: green;"|2 ||style="color: green;"|2 ||style="color: blue"|1½ || -  || style="color: blue;" |1½ ||style="color: red;"|2½ ||style="color: red;"|3 ||style="color: red;"|3 ||style="color: green;"|2 ||style="color: green;"|2 ||style="color: green;"|2 ||style="color: red;"|3 ||style="color: red;"|3
! 
|5 ||3 ||7 ||align=center|32
|-
! 24
| align=left|
|style="color: blue;"|½ ||style="color: red;"|2½ ||style="color: blue;"|½ ||style="color: green;"|2 ||style="color: blue;"|1½ ||style="color: green;"|2 ||style="color: red;"|2½ || -  || style="color: red" |3 ||style="color: blue;"|½ ||style="color: red;"|2½ ||style="color: red;"|2½ ||style="color: blue"|1½ ||style="color: red;"|3½ ||style="color: red;"|3½ ||style="color: red;"|2½
! 
|8 ||5 ||2 ||align=center|31
|-
! 25
| align=left|
|style="color: blue;"|1½ ||style="color: blue;"|1½ ||style="color: blue;"|1 ||style="color: green"|2 ||style="color: blue;"|1½ ||style="color: green;"|2 ||style="color: blue;"|1½ ||style="color: blue"|1 || -  || style="color: red;" |2½ ||style="color: red;"|2½ ||style="color: red;"|2½ ||style="color: red;"|2½ ||style="color: green;"|2 ||style="color: red"|3½ ||style="color: red;"|3½
! 
|6 ||6 ||3 ||align=center|31
|-
! 26
| align=left|
|style="color: blue;"|1 ||style="color: blue"|1½ ||style="color: red"|2½ ||style="color: blue;"|1½ ||style="color: blue;"|1½ ||style="color: green;"|2 ||style="color: blue;"|1 ||style="color: red;"|3½ ||style="color: blue;"|1½ || -  || style="color: blue;" |1½ ||style="color: green;"|2 ||style="color: red"|2½ ||style="color: red;"|3½ ||style="color: red;"|3 ||style="color: red;"|2½
! 
|6 ||7 ||2 ||align=center|31
|-
! 27
| align=left|
|style="color: blue;"|1 ||style="color: green;"|2 ||style="color: blue;"|1½ ||style="color: blue;"|1 ||style="color: red;"|3 ||style="color: blue;"|1½ ||style="color: blue;"|1 ||style="color: blue;"|1½ ||style="color: blue;"|1½ ||style="color: red;"|2½ || -  || style="color: green;" |2 ||style="color: green;"|2 ||style="color: green;"|2 ||style="color: red;"|3 ||style="color: red;"|3½
! 
|4 ||7 ||4 ||align=center|29
|-
! 28
| align=left|
|style="color: blue;"|1 ||style="color: blue;"|0 ||style="color: blue;"|1 ||style="color: blue"|1½ ||style="color: red;"|2½ ||style="color: green;"|2 ||style="color: green;"|2 ||style="color: blue;"|1½ ||style="color: blue;"|1½ ||style="color: green;"|2 ||style="color: green;"|2 || -  || style="color: green;" |2 ||style="color: red"|3½ ||style="color: red;"|2½ ||style="color: green;"|2
! 
|3 ||6 ||6 ||align=center|27
|-
! 29
| align=left|
|style="color: blue;"|½ ||style="color: green;"|2 ||style="color: blue;"|0 ||style="color: blue;"|1 ||style="color: red;"|2½ ||style="color: blue;"|1½ ||style="color: green;"|2 ||style="color: red"|2½ ||style="color: blue;"|1½ ||style="color: blue"|1½ ||style="color: green;"|2 ||style="color: green;"|2 || -  || style="color: blue;" |1½ ||style="color: green;"|2 ||style="color: red;"|3
! 
|3 ||7 ||5 ||align=center|25½
|-
! 30
| align=left|
|style="color: blue;"|½ ||style="color: blue;"|½ ||style="color: blue"|1½ ||style="color: blue;"|1½ ||style="color: green;"|2 ||style="color: green;"|2 ||style="color: green;"|2 ||style="color: blue;"|½ ||style="color: green;"|2 ||style="color: blue;"|½ ||style="color: red;"|2 ||style="color: blue"|½ ||style="color: red;"|2½ || -  || style="color: red;" |2½ ||style="color: red;"|2½
! 
|3 ||7 ||5 ||align=center|23
|-
! 31
| align=left|
|style="color: blue;"|1 ||style="color: blue"|½ ||style="color: red;"|2½ ||style="color: blue"|1½ ||style="color: blue;"|1½ ||style="color: blue;"|1 ||style="color: blue;"|1 ||style="color: blue;"|½ ||style="color: blue"|½ ||style="color: blue;"|1 ||style="color: blue;"|1 ||style="color: blue;"|1½ ||style="color: green;"|2 ||style="color: blue;"|1½ || -  ||style="color: red;"|2½
! 
|2 ||12 ||1 ||align=center|19½
|-
! 32
| align=left|
|style="color: blue;"|1 ||style="color: blue"|½ ||style="color: blue;"|1 ||style="color: blue"|1 ||style="color: blue;"|1½ ||style="color: blue;"|1½ ||style="color: blue;"|1 ||style="color: blue;"|1½ ||style="color: blue"|½ ||style="color: blue;"|1½ ||style="color: blue;"|½ ||style="color: green;"|2 ||style="color: blue;"|1 ||style="color: blue;"|1½ ||style="color: blue;"|1½ || -
! 
|0 ||14 ||1 ||align=center|17½
|}
 Tunisia refused to play Israel because of political reasons. The score was set by default.

Final «C» 
 Matches played in semi-finals and not played are italicized.
{| class="wikitable"
|-
! Place
! Country
! 33 !!34 !!35 !!36 !!37 !!38 !!39 !!40 !!41 !!42 !!43 !!44 !!45 !!46 !!47 !!WD
! !!+ !!- !!= !!Points
|- 
! 33
| align=left|
| -  || style="color: blue;" |1½ ||style="color: red;"|3 ||style="color: red;"|3 ||style="color: red;"|4 ||style="color: blue;"|1 ||style="color: green;"|2 ||style="color: red;"|3½ ||style="color: red;"|4 ||style="color: red;"|3 ||style="color: red;"|4 ||style="color: red;"|2½ ||style="color: red;"|2½ ||style="color: red;"|2½ ||style="color: red;"|2½ || 2½
! 
|11 ||2 ||1 ||align=center|39
|-
! 34
| align=left|
|style="color: red"|2½ || -  || style="color: blue" |1 ||style="color: red"|3 ||style="color: blue"|1½ ||style="color: red"|3½ ||style="color: green"|2 ||style="color: green"|2 ||style="color: red"|3 ||style="color: green"|2 ||style="color: red"|3 ||style="color: red"|2½ ||style="color: red"|3 ||style="color: red"|3 ||style="color: red"|2½ ||
! 
|9 ||2 ||3 ||align=center|34½
|-
! 35
| align=left|
|style="color: blue"|1 ||style="color: red"|3 || -  || style="color: red" |2½ ||style="color: red"|3 ||style="color: red"|3 ||style="color: green"|2 ||style="color: red"|2½ ||style="color: blue"|1½ ||style="color: red"|2½ ||style="color: blue"|1½ ||style="color: green"|2 ||style="color: red"|3 ||style="color: green"|2 ||style="color: red"|3 || 2
! 
|8 ||3 ||3 ||align=center|32½
|-
! 36
| align=left|
|style="color: blue;"|1 ||style="color: blue"|1 ||style="color: blue;"|1½ || -  || style="color: green;" |2 ||style="color: blue"|1½ ||style="color: red;"|3 ||style="color: blue;"|1½ ||style="color: blue"|½ ||style="color: red;"|3½ ||style="color: red;"|3½ ||style="color: red"|3 ||style="color: red;"|3 ||style="color: red;"|2½ ||style="color: red"|4 || 2½
! 
|7 ||6 ||1 ||align=center|31½
|-
! 37
| align=left|
|style="color: blue;"|0 ||style="color: red;"|2½ ||style="color: blue;"|1 ||style="color: green;"|2 || -  || style="color: red;" |2½ ||style="color: red;"|2½ ||style="color: red;"|3½ ||style="color: blue;"|1 ||style="color: blue;"|1½ ||style="color: red;"|2½ ||style="color: red;"|2½ ||style="color: blue;"|1½ ||style="color: red;"|4 ||style="color: red;"|3½ || 2
! 
|8 ||5 ||1 ||align=center|30½
|-
! 38
| align=left|
|style="color: red;"|3 ||style="color: blue;"|½ ||style="color: blue;"|1 ||style="color: red"|2½ ||style="color: blue;"|1½ || -  || style="color: red" |2½ ||style="color: red;"|3 ||style="color: blue;"|1½ ||style="color: red;"|3 ||style="color: green;"|2 ||style="color: green;"|2 ||style="color: red;"|3 ||style="color: red;"|2½ ||style="color: green;"|2 || 2½
! 
|7 ||4 ||3 ||align=center|30
|-
! 39
| align=left|
|style="color: green"|2 ||style="color: green;"|2 ||style="color: green;"|2 ||style="color: blue;"|1 ||style="color: blue;"|1½ ||style="color: blue"|1½ || -  || style="color: green;" |2 ||style="color: blue;"|1½ ||style="color: red;"|3 ||style="color: red;"|2½ ||style="color: red;"|2½ ||style="color: red;"|3 ||style="color: blue;"|1½ ||style="color: red;"|4 || 3
! 
|5 ||5 ||4 ||align=center|30
|-
! 40
| align=left|
|style="color: blue;"|½ ||style="color: green;"|2 ||style="color: blue;"|1½ ||style="color: red;"|2½ ||style="color: blue;"|½ ||style="color: blue;"|1 ||style="color: green;"|2 || -  || style="color: red" |2½ ||style="color: green;"|2 ||style="color: green;"|2 ||style="color: red;"|2½ ||style="color: red"|2½ ||style="color: red;"|3 ||style="color: red;"|3 || 
! 
|6 ||4 ||4 ||align=center|27½
|-
! 41
| align=left|
|style="color: blue;"|0 ||style="color: blue;"|1 ||style="color: red;"|2½ ||style="color: red"|3½ ||style="color: red;"|3 ||style="color: red;"|2½ ||style="color: red;"|2½ ||style="color: blue"|1½ || -  || style="color: green;" |2 ||style="color: green;"|2 ||style="color: green;"|2 ||style="color: green;"|2 ||style="color: blue;"|1½ ||style="color: blue"|1½ || 1
! 
|5 ||5 ||4 ||align=center|27½
|-
! 42
| align=left|
|style="color: blue;"|1 ||style="color: green"|2 ||style="color: blue"|1½ ||style="color: blue;"|½ ||style="color: red;"|2½ ||style="color: blue;"|1 ||style="color: blue;"|1 ||style="color: green;"|2 ||style="color: green;"|2 || -  || style="color: green;" |2 ||style="color: red;"|2½ ||style="color: red"|2½ ||style="color: red;"|3 ||style="color: red;"|3½ || ½
! 
|5 ||5 ||4 ||align=center|27
|-
! 43
| align=left|
|style="color: blue;"|0 ||style="color: blue;"|1 ||style="color: red;"|2½ ||style="color: blue;"|½ ||style="color: blue;"|1½ ||style="color: green;"|2 ||style="color: blue;"|1½ ||style="color: green;"|2 ||style="color: green;"|2 ||style="color: green;"|2 || -  || style="color: red;" |2½ ||style="color: red;"|3 ||style="color: green;"|2 ||style="color: red;"|2½ || 1½
! 
|4 ||5 ||5 ||align=center|25
|-
! 44
| align=left|
|style="color: blue;"|1½ ||style="color: blue;"|1½ ||style="color: green;"|2 ||style="color: blue"|1 ||style="color: blue;"|1½ ||style="color: green;"|2 ||style="color: blue;"|1½ ||style="color: blue;"|1½ ||style="color: green;"|2 ||style="color: blue;"|1½ ||style="color: blue;"|1½ || -  || style="color: green;" |2 ||style="color: red"|2½ ||style="color: red;"|2½ || 2½
! 
|2 ||8 ||4 ||align=center|24½
|-
! 45
| align=left|
|style="color: blue;"|1½ ||style="color: blue;"|1 ||style="color: blue;"|1 ||style="color: blue;"|1 ||style="color: red;"|2½ ||style="color: blue;"|1 ||style="color: blue;"|1 ||style="color: blue"|1½ ||style="color: green;"|2 ||style="color: blue"|1½ ||style="color: blue;"|1 ||style="color: green;"|2 || -  || style="color: red;" |2½ ||style="color: red;"|3 || 1½
! 
|3 ||9 ||2 ||align=center|22½
|-
! 46
| align=left|
|style="color: blue;"|1½ ||style="color: blue;"|1 ||style="color: green"|2 ||style="color: blue;"|1½ ||style="color: blue;"|0 ||style="color: blue;"|1½ ||style="color: red;"|2½ ||style="color: blue;"|1 ||style="color: red;"|2½ ||style="color: blue;"|1 ||style="color: red;"|2½ ||style="color: blue"|1½ ||style="color: blue;"|1½ || -  || style="color: red;" |2½ || 1
! 
|3 ||9 ||2 ||align=center|22
|-
! 47
| align=left|
|style="color: blue;"|1½ ||style="color: blue"|1½ ||style="color: blue;"|1 ||style="color: blue"|0 ||style="color: blue;"|½ ||style="color: green;"|2 ||style="color: blue;"|0 ||style="color: blue;"|1 ||style="color: blue"|2½ ||style="color: blue;"|½ ||style="color: blue;"|1½ ||style="color: blue;"|1½ ||style="color: blue;"|1 ||style="color: blue;"|1½ || -  ||
! 
|1 ||12 ||1 ||align=center|16
|-
! WD
| align=left| South Africa
| ½ || || 2 || 1½ || 2 || 1½ || 1 || || 3 || 3½ || 2½ || 1½ || 2½ || 3 || || -
! 
|- ||- ||- ||-
|}
 South Africa were expelled from FIDE with three rounds to go and withdrew from the event. Their scores were set as friendlies.

Final «D» 
 Matches played in semi-finals are italicized.
{| class="wikitable"
|-
! Place
! Country
! 48 !!49 !!50 !!51 !!52 !!53 !!54 !!55 !!56 !!57 !!58 !!59 !!60 !!61 !!62 !!63
! !!+ !!- !!= !!Points
|- 
! 48
| align=left|
| -  || style="color: green;" |2 ||style="color: red;"|2½ ||style="color: red;"|3½ ||style="color: blue;"|1½ ||style="color: red;"|3 ||style="color: red;"|3½ ||style="color: red;"|3½ ||style="color: red;"|3½ ||style="color: red;"|4 ||style="color: red;"|3 ||style="color: red;"|3½ ||style="color: red;"|4 ||style="color: red;"|4 ||style="color: red;"|4 ||style="color: red;"|4
! 
|13 ||1 ||1 ||align=center|49½
|-
! 49
| align=left|
|style="color: green"|2 || -  || style="color: green" |2 ||style="color: red"|3 ||style="color: green"|2 ||style="color: red"|3 ||style="color: green"|2 ||style="color: red"|3½ ||style="color: red"|3½ ||style="color: red"|3½ ||style="color: red"|2½ ||style="color: red"|3 ||style="color: red"|3½ ||style="color: red"|3 ||style="color: red"|4 ||style="color: red;"|4
! 
|11 ||0 ||4 ||align=center|44½
|-
! 50
| align=left| 
|style="color: blue"|1½ ||style="color: green"|2 || -  || style="color: blue" |1 ||style="color: red"|3½ ||style="color: red"|3 ||style="color: red"|3½ ||style="color: red"|3½ ||style="color: green"|2 ||style="color: red"|3 ||style="color: red"|3 ||style="color: red"|2½ ||style="color: red"|4 ||style="color: red"|4 ||style="color: red"|4 ||style="color: red;"|3
! 
|11 ||2 ||2 ||align=center|43½
|-
! 51
| align=left|
|style="color: blue;"|½ ||style="color: blue"|1 ||style="color: red;"|3 || -  || style="color: red;" |2½ ||style="color: red"|3 ||style="color: blue;"|1½ ||style="color: green;"|2 ||style="color: red"|2½ ||style="color: red;"|2½ ||style="color: red;"|3 ||style="color: red"|3 ||style="color: red;"|3 ||style="color: red;"|4 ||style="color: red"|3½ ||style="color: red;"|3½
! 
|11 ||3 ||1 ||align=center|38½
|-
! 52
| align=left|
|style="color: red;"|2½ ||style="color: green;"|2 ||style="color: blue;"|½ ||style="color: blue;"|1½ || -  || style="color: green;"|2 ||style="color: red;"|2½ ||style="color: green;"|2 ||style="color: red;"|2½ ||style="color: green;"|2 ||style="color: green;"|2 ||style="color: red;"|3 ||style="color: red;"|3 ||style="color: green;"|2 ||style="color: red;"|4 ||style="color: red;"|3½
! 
|7 ||2 ||6 ||align=center|35
|-
! 53
| align=left|
|style="color: blue;"|1 ||style="color: blue;"|1 ||style="color: blue;"|1 ||style="color: blue"|1 ||style="color: green;"|2 || -  || style="color: red" |3½ ||style="color: green;"|2 ||style="color: red;"|3½ ||style="color: red;"|2½ ||style="color: green;"|2 ||style="color: green;"|2 ||style="color: green;"|2 ||style="color: red;"|4 ||style="color: red;"|4 ||style="color: red;"|3½
! 
|6 ||4 ||5 ||align=center|35
|-
! 54
| align=left|
|style="color: blue"|½ ||style="color: green;"|2 ||style="color: blue;"|½ ||style="color: red;"|2½ ||style="color: blue;"|1½ ||style="color: blue"|½ || -  || style="color: red;" |2½ ||style="color: green;"|2 ||style="color: green;"|2 ||style="color: red;"|3 ||style="color: red;"|3 ||style="color: red;"|3 ||style="color: red;"|3 ||style="color: red;"|4 ||style="color: red;"|3
! 
|8 ||4 ||3 ||align=center|33
|-
! 55
| align=left|
|style="color: blue;"|½ ||style="color: blue;"|½ ||style="color: blue;"|½ ||style="color: green;"|2 ||style="color: green;"|2 ||style="color: green;"|2 ||style="color: blue;"|1½ || -  || style="color: blue" |1½ ||style="color: red;"|2½ ||style="color: green;"|2 ||style="color: red;"|3½ ||style="color: green"|2 ||style="color: red;"|3 ||style="color: red;"|2½ ||style="color: red;"|3½
! 
|5 ||5 ||5 ||align=center|29½
|-
! 56
| align=left|
|style="color: blue;"|½ ||style="color: blue;"|½ ||style="color: green;"|2 ||style="color: blue"|1½ ||style="color: blue;"|1½ ||style="color: blue;"|½ ||style="color: green;"|2 ||style="color: red"|2½ || -  || style="color: blue;" |1 ||style="color: blue;"|1½ ||style="color: red;"|2½ ||style="color: red;"|2½ ||style="color: red;"|3 ||style="color: red"|4 ||style="color: red;"|3½
! 
|6 ||7 ||2 ||align=center|29
|-
! 57
| align=left|
|style="color: blue;"|0 ||style="color: blue"|½ ||style="color: blue"|1 ||style="color: blue;"|1½ ||style="color: green;"|2 ||style="color: blue;"|1½ ||style="color: green;"|2 ||style="color: blue;"|1½ ||style="color: red;"|3 || -  || style="color: red;" |2½ ||style="color: red;"|3 ||style="color: green"|2 ||style="color: blue;"|1½ ||style="color: red;"|3 ||style="color: red;"|2½
! 
|5 ||7 ||3 ||align=center|27½
|-
! 58
| align=left|
|style="color: blue;"|1 ||style="color: blue;"|1½ ||style="color: blue;"|1 ||style="color: blue;"|1 ||style="color: green;"|2 ||style="color: green;"|2 ||style="color: blue;"|1 ||style="color: green;"|2 ||style="color: red;"|2½ ||style="color: blue;"|1½ || -  || style="color: red;" |2½ ||style="color: green;"|2 ||style="color: red;"|2½ ||style="color: blue;"|1½ ||style="color: red;"|3½
! 
|4 ||7 ||4 ||align=center|27½
|-
! 59
| align=left|
|style="color: blue;"|½ ||style="color: blue;"|1 ||style="color: blue;"|1½ ||style="color: blue"|1 ||style="color: blue;"|1 ||style="color: green;"|2 ||style="color: blue;"|1 ||style="color: blue;"|½ ||style="color: blue;"|1½ ||style="color: blue;"|1 ||style="color: blue;"|1½ || -  || style="color: red;" |3½ ||style="color: red"|2½ ||style="color: red;"|3½ ||style="color: red;"|2½
! 
|4 ||10 ||1 ||align=center|24½
|-
! 60
| align=left|
|style="color: blue;"|0 ||style="color: blue;"|½ ||style="color: blue;"|0 ||style="color: blue;"|1 ||style="color: blue;"|1 ||style="color: green;"|2 ||style="color: blue;"|1 ||style="color: green"|2 ||style="color: blue;"|1½ ||style="color: green"|2 ||style="color: green;"|2 ||style="color: blue;"|½ || -  || style="color: blue;" |1½ ||style="color: red;"|2½ ||style="color: red;"|4
! 
|2 ||9 ||4 ||align=center|21½
|-
! 61
| align=left|
|style="color: blue;"|0 ||style="color: blue;"|1 ||style="color: blue"|0 ||style="color: blue;"|0 ||style="color: green;"|2 ||style="color: blue;"|0 ||style="color: blue;"|1 ||style="color: blue;"|1 ||style="color: blue;"|1 ||style="color: red;"|2½ ||style="color: blue;"|1½ ||style="color: blue"|1½ ||style="color: red;"|2½ || -  || style="color: green;" |2 ||style="color: blue;"|1½
! 
|2 ||11 ||2 ||align=center|17½
|-
! 62
| align=left|
|style="color: blue;"|0 ||style="color: blue"|0 ||style="color: blue;"|0 ||style="color: blue"|½ ||style="color: blue;"|0 ||style="color: blue;"|0 ||style="color: blue;"|0 ||style="color: blue;"|1½ ||style="color: blue"|0 ||style="color: blue;"|1 ||style="color: red;"|2½ ||style="color: blue;"|½ ||style="color: blue;"|1½ ||style="color: green;"|2 || -  ||style="color: red;"|2½
! 
|2 ||12 ||1 ||align=center|12
|-
! 63
| align=left|
|style="color: blue;"|0 ||style="color: blue"|0 ||style="color: blue;"|1 ||style="color: blue"|½ ||style="color: blue;"|½ ||style="color: blue;"|½ ||style="color: blue;"|1 ||style="color: blue;"|½ ||style="color: blue"|½ ||style="color: blue;"|1½ ||style="color: blue;"|½ ||style="color: blue;"|1½ ||style="color: blue;"|0 ||style="color: red;"|2½ ||style="color: blue;"|1½ || -
! 
|1 ||14 ||0 ||align=center|12
|}

Final «E» 
 Matches played in semi-finals and not played are italicized.
{| class="wikitable"
|-
! Place
! Country
! 64 !!65 !!66 !!67 !!68 !!69 !!70 !!71 !!72 !!73
! !!+ !!- !!= !!Points
|- 
! 64
| align=left|
| -  || style="color: red;" |2½ ||style="color: red;"|4 ||style="color: red;"|3 ||style="color: red;"|3½ ||style="color: green;"|2 ||style="color: red;"|3 ||style="color: red;"|3 ||style="color: red;"|4 ||style="color: red;"|3½
! 
|8 ||0 ||1 ||align=center|28½
|-
! 65
| align=left|
|style="color: blue"|1½ || -  || style="color: green" |2 ||style="color: red"|3 ||style="color: green"|2 ||style="color: green"|2 ||style="color: green"|2 ||style="color: red"|4 ||style="color: red"|3½ ||style="color: red"|4
! 
|4 ||1 ||4 ||align=center|24½
|-
! 66
| align=left|
|style="color: blue"|0 ||style="color: green"|2 || -  || style="color: blue" |1 ||style="color: red"|3½ ||style="color: green"|2 ||style="color: red"|3½ ||style="color: red"|4 ||style="color: green"|2 ||style="color: red"|3
! 
|4 ||2 ||3 ||align=center|21
|-
! 67
| align=left|
|style="color: blue;"|1 ||style="color: blue"|1 ||style="color: red;"|3 || -  || style="color: red;" |2½ ||style="color: red"|3 ||style="color: red;"|2½ ||style="color: green;"|2 ||style="color: red"|2½ ||style="color: red;"|2½
! 
|6 ||2 ||1 ||align=center|20
|-
! 68
| align=left|
|style="color: blue;"|½ ||style="color: green;"|2 ||style="color: blue;"|½ ||style="color: blue;"|1½ || -  || style="color: red;"|2½ ||style="color: red;"|2½ ||style="color: red;"|3 ||style="color: red;"|3 ||style="color: red;"|3½
! 
|5 ||3 ||1 ||align=center|19
|-
! 69
| align=left|
|style="color: green;"|2 ||style="color: green;"|2 ||style="color: green;"|2 ||style="color: blue"|1 ||style="color: blue;"|1½ || -  || style="color: green;"|2 ||style="color: green;"|2 ||style="color: red;"|2½ ||style="color: red;"|3
! 
|2 ||2 ||5 ||align=center|18
|-
! 70
| align=left|
|style="color: blue"|1 ||style="color: green;"|2 ||style="color: blue;"|½ ||style="color: blue;"|1½ ||style="color: blue;"|1½ ||style="color: green"|2 || -  || style="color: red;" |3 ||style="color: red;"|3 ||style="color: red;"|2½
! 
|3 ||4 ||2 ||align=center|17
|-
! 71
| align=left|
|style="color: blue;"|1 ||style="color: blue;"|0 ||style="color: blue;"|0 ||style="color: green;"|2 ||style="color: blue;"|1 ||style="color: green;"|2 ||style="color: blue;"|1 || -  || style="color: red;"|3 ||style="color: red;"|3
! 
|2 ||5 ||2 ||align=center|13
|-
! 72
| align=left|
|style="color: blue;"|0 ||style="color: blue;"|½ ||style="color: green;"|2 ||style="color: blue"|1½ ||style="color: blue;"|1 ||style="color: blue;"|1½ ||style="color: blue;"|1 ||style="color: blue"|1 || -  || style="color: red;"|2½
! 
|1 ||7 ||1 ||align=center|11
|-
! 73
| align=left|
|style="color: blue;"|½ ||style="color: blue"|0 ||style="color: blue"|1 ||style="color: blue;"|1½ ||style="color: blue;"|½ ||style="color: blue;"|1 ||style="color: blue;"|1½ ||style="color: blue;"|1 ||style="color: blue;"|1½ || -
! 
|0 ||9 ||0 ||align=center|8½
|}
 Iraq and Algeria refused to play Rhodesia because of political reasons. The scores were set by default.

Individual medals

 Board 1:  Anatoly Karpov 12 / 14 = 85.7%
 Board 2:  Andreas Dückstein 10 / 12 = 83.3%
 Board 3:  Boris Spassky 11 / 15 = 73.3%
 Board 4:  Tigran Petrosian 12½ / 14 = 89.3%
 1st reserve:  Mikhail Tal 11½ / 15 = 76.7%
 2nd reserve:  James Tarjan and  Franciscus Kuijpers 11 / 13 = 84.6%

References

21st Chess Olympiad: Nice 1974 OlimpBase

21
Olympiad 21
Chess Olympiad 21
Chess Olympiad 21
Olympiad 21
Chess Olympiad 21
Chess Olympiad 21